Joan Sterndale-Bennett (5 March 191427 April 1996) was a British stage and film actress, best known as a character comedian for her work at the Players' Theatre in London.

Career
Born into a musical family, her father Thomas Case Sterndale Bennett was a songwriter, entertainer and a grandson of the composer William Sterndale Bennett.  Her mother Christine Bywater was a professional oratorio singer.

After studying at the Royal Academy of Dramatic Art and later with the American choreographer Buddy Bradley, she started with repertory in 1933 in Strange Orchestra at Worthing before moving to London's West End.   From 1938 she appeared in the Herbert Farjeon reviews Nine Sharp, Diversion, Light and Shade, In Town Again and the pantomime The Glass Slipper. In that same year at the invitation of Leonard Sachs she joined the Players Theatre which was to be the start of a forty-year association at the home of traditional music hall in London and which provided her with a platform to excel in that special direct relationship between the performer and audiences.

In 1943 she made her film debut taking small parts in Anthony Asquith's We Dive at Dawn and as Rose in Bernard Miles's Tawny Pipit.  In 1951, in collaboration with Hattie Jacques, she adapted Ali Baba, or, the Thirty-Nine Thieves and later wrote a Victorian pantomime based on Riquet with a Tuft as a special show for the Festival of Britain.

After four years starring as the French schoolmistress in the musical The Boy Friend she made her Broadway debut at the Strollers Theatre Club in 1961 in Time, Gentlemen Please in which she was hailed as Britain's answer to Ethel Merman.  In 1966 she gave a critically acclaimed performance as Mrs Banks in Barefoot in the Park to be followed by the long running comedy No Sex Please, We're British in London and South Africa. The BBC TV production in 1958 of The Noble Spaniard by Somerset Maugham saw her starring alongside Margaret Rutherford and Kenneth Williams. 
Returning to her roots she regularly appeared in the BBC TV series The Good Old Days based on the formula used at the Players Theatre compered by Leonard Sachs.

Prone to stage fright which was never apparent to her audiences, she declined several professional opportunities which might well have secured her greater recognition, as her abilities deserved. One critic remarked that, like so many actors, she suffered anguish behind the clown's mask.

She was briefly married to the actor John Barron during the Second World War. She had no children.  She retired early to become something of a recluse living with her stepmother Mary Maskelyne, a member of the famous illusionist family and later wardrobe mistress at the Players Theatre.

Selected plays and musicals
 Strange Orchestra (1933)
 The Glass Slipper (1945)
 See You Again (1952)
 The Boy Friend (musical) (1954)
 Time Gentlemen Please! (1961)
 Barefoot in the Park (1966)
 No Sex Please, We're British (1970)

Selected filmography
 We Dive at Dawn (1943) - (uncredited)
 Tawny Pipit (1944) - Rose
 The Woman in the Hall (1947) - Shop assistant
 Brighton Rock (1948) - Delia
 Poet's Pub (1949) - (uncredited)
 Angels One Five (1952) - W.A.A.F.
 The Spider's Web (1960) - Mrs. Elgin
 Don't Bother to Knock (1961) - Spinster
 San Ferry Ann (1965) - Madame of Hotel 
 Jules Verne's Rocket to the Moon (1967) - Queen Victoria
 Decline and Fall... of a Birdwatcher (1968) - Lady Circumference

References

External links

1914 births
1996 deaths
Actresses from London
British film actresses
British stage actresses
20th-century British actresses
Alumni of RADA
20th-century English women
20th-century English people